Gloria Lavern Collins (June 12, 1948 – March 13, 2005), better known as Lyn Collins, was an American soul singer best known for working with James Brown in the 1970s and for the influential 1972 funk single, "Think (About It)". 

A favorite among hip hop, R&B, and dance music producers for decades, Collins is by far the most sampled female artist of all time, with portions of her recordings used in well over 3,500 songs.

Early life and career
Collins began her recording career at age 14. She played with Charles Pike & The Scholars. She sent her demo tape to James Brown who initially prioritized her after Marva Whitney and Vicki Anderson. After Anderson left Brown for the second time, Collins received the opportunity to be the lead female in Brown's touring lineup. Her first single released was "Wheel of Life" in 1971 on King Records, when Brown left the label, Collins went to Polydor and People which left the record neglected. Collins recorded "What My Baby Needs Now Is a Little More Lovin'" with James Brown in 1972. 

Her biggest solo hit was the James Brown-produced gospel-style song "Think (About It)", from her 1972 album of the same name on People Records. The song contains five breaks which have been sampled widely in hip-hop and drum and bass, most famously, the "Yeah! Woo!" and "It takes two to make a thing go right" loops in Rob Base and DJ E-Z Rock's "It Takes Two" which is composed almost completely from samples of Think, including a few lines of Collins' vocals. She also recorded the 1974 funk song "Rock Me Again and Again and Again and Again and Again and Again". Furthermore, it was used in the early sociocritical eurodance classic "I Can't Stand It" by Twenty 4 Seven, and in the 2013 EDM/House song "Everything You Never Had (We Had It All)" by Breach. 

Another album followed in 1975, Check Me Out If You Don't Know Me by Now. By the late 1970s Collins left Brown. She would go on to sing backup for Dionne Warwick and Rod Stewart. In the late 1980s and early 1990s, Collins attempted a comeback as a dance/club diva, recording the house single "Shout" for Belgium's ARS label. During this period a European tour was completed and a 1987 show alongside James Brown's Funky People which did not feature James Brown performing. In 1993, Collins' profile was given a boost by female dancehall singer Patra, who invited Collins to perform on her hit remake of "Think (About It)"; partly due to the resulting interest, her two official albums were reissued in England and the Netherlands.

In February 2005, Collins embarked on her first solo tour. For three weeks, she performed in the United Kingdom, France, Germany, Austria and Switzerland.

Death
Shortly after returning from her 2005 European tour, Collins died from a seizure related to cardiac arrhythmia in Pasadena, California, at the age of 56. Fellow James Brown backup singer Martha High was alongside Collins during her final days alive.

Legacy
In 2006, Paris-based Hi&Fly Records released a live album titled Mama Feelgood, which included recordings from her European tour and some interview clips. This release was produced by German-born DJ Pari, who produced for Marva Whitney and managed Collins' last tour.

Reflecting on her time working with James Brown, she reportedly said "I would have preferred to sing more and scream less."

Cultural references
In October 2004, "Rock Me Again and Again" and "Think (About It)" featured on the Grand Theft Auto: San Andreas soundtrack, playing on fictional radio station Master Sounds 98.3. "Rock Me Again and Again" was covered by synth band The Human League on their 1984 album Hysteria. Bruce Springsteen's song "Shackled and Drawn" from his 2012 album Wrecking Ball and Ludacris' song "Southern Fried Intro" from his 2003 album Chicken-n-Beer both feature an excerpt from Collins' song "Me and My Baby Got Our Own Thing Going".

Discography

Albums

Singles

References

External links
 
 
 

1948 births
2005 deaths
People from Lee County, Texas
Singers from Texas
African-American women singers
American soul singers
American funk singers
James Brown vocalists